The NBA G League Most Valuable Player (MVP) is an annual NBA G League award given since the league's inaugural season to the best performing player of the regular season. The league's head coaches determine the award by voting and it is usually presented to the honoree during the G-League playoffs.

No player has been named the MVP more than once, and only one international player has won the award. Ansu Sesay was the inaugural winner while playing for the Greenville Groove. By position, guards have won the award with 12 winners, followed by forwards with eight. Only one center has won, Courtney Sims in 2008–09.

Winners

See also
NBA Most Valuable Player Award

References

External links
G-League Most Valuable Player Award Winners at basketball-reference.com

National Basketball Association lists
Valuable
Awards established in 2002
National Basketball Association most valuable player awards
Basketball most valuable player awards
2002 establishments in the United States